The 2007 AFF Futsal Championship was the fourth edition of the tournament.  It took place from 26 March to 31 March 2007 in Bangkok, Thailand.

Group stage 
All times are Indochina Time (ICT) – UTC+07:00

Group A

Group B

Knockout stage 
All times are Indochina Time (ICT) – UTC+07:00

Bracket

Semi-finals

Third place play-off

Final

Champions

References 
AFF FUTSAL CHAMPIONSHIP 2007 AseanFootball.org. ASEAN Football Federation.

External links
 Old website (Archived)
 Official website

AFF Futsal Championship
2007
2007  in Asian futsal
Fut